The San Francisco Peaks (Navajo: , , Hopi: Nuva'tukya'ovi, Western Apache: Dził Tso, Keres: Tsii Bina, Southern Paiute: Nuvaxatuh, Havasupai-Hualapai: Hvehasahpatch/Huassapatch/Wik'hanbaja, Yavapai: Wi:mun Kwa, Zuni: Sunha K'hbchu Yalanne, Mojave:  'Amat 'Iikwe Nyava) are a volcanic mountain range in the San Francisco volcanic field in north central Arizona, just north of Flagstaff and a remnant of the former San Francisco Mountain. The San Francisco Peaks are the remains of an eroded stratovolcano. An aquifer within the caldera supplies much of Flagstaff's water while the mountain itself is in the Coconino National Forest, a popular recreation site. The Arizona Snowbowl ski area is on the western slopes of Humphreys Peak, and has been the subject of major controversy involving several tribes and environmental groups.

Geography

The six highest individual peaks in Arizona are contained in the range:
 Humphreys Peak, 
 Agassiz Peak, 
 Fremont Peak, 
 Aubineau Peak, 
 Rees Peak, 
 Doyle Peak, 

The mountain provides a number of recreational opportunities, including wintertime snow skiing and hiking the rest of the year. Hart Prairie is a popular hiking area and Nature Conservancy preserve located below the mountain's ski resort, Arizona Snowbowl.

History
In 1629, 147 years before San Francisco, California, received that name, Spanish friars founded a mission at a Hopi Indian village in honor of St. Francis, 65 miles from the peaks. Seventeenth century Franciscans at Oraibi village gave the name San Francisco to the peaks to honor St. Francis of Assisi, the founder of their order.
The mountain man Antoine Leroux visited the San Francisco Peaks in the mid-1850s, and guided several American expeditions exploring and surveying northern Arizona. Leroux guided them to the only reliable spring, one on the western side of the peaks, which was later named Leroux Springs.

Around 1877, John Willard Young, a son of the Mormon leader Brigham Young, claimed the area around Leroux Springs, and he built Fort Moroni, a log stockade, to house railroad tie-cutters for the Atlantic & Pacific Railroad, which was then being built across northern Arizona.

In 1898, U.S. President William McKinley established the San Francisco Mountain Forest Reserve, at the request of Gifford Pinchot, the head of the U.S. Division of Forestry. The local reaction was hostilecitizens of Williams, Arizona, protested and the Williams News editorialized that the reserve "virtually destroys Coconino County." In 1908, the San Francisco Mountain Forest Reserve became a part of the new Coconino National Forest.

In 2002, Arizona Snowbowl, the ski resort on the peaks, proposed a plan to expand and begin snowmaking using reclaimed water made of treated sewage effluent. A coalition of Indian tribes and environmental groups sued the Coconino National Forest, which leases the land to the ski resort, in an attempt to stop the proposed expansion, citing serious impacts to traditional culture, public health, and the environment. In 2011, construction began on a wastewater pipeline to the peaks.  In response, there was an ongoing series of protest actions including demonstrations and lockdowns in which protesters chained themselves to construction equipment. In 2012, a federal appeals court ruled in favor of Arizona Snowbowl, and wastewater to snow conversion began in the 2012–2013 ski season.

Ecology
The biologist Clinton Hart Merriam studied these mountains and surrounding areas in 1889, describing a set of six life zones found from the bottom of the Grand Canyon to the summit of the mountains, based on elevation, latitude, and average precipitation. He designated their characteristic flora, as follows:

 Lower Sonoran Zone – Sonoran Desert plants
 Upper Sonoran Zone – pinyon and juniper woodlands
 Transition Zone – ponderosa pine forests
 Canadian Zone – mixed conifer forest
 Hudsonian Zone – spruce-fir or subalpine conifer forest
 Arctic-Alpine Zone – alpine tundra

Merriam considered that these life zones could be extended to cover all the world's vegetation types with the addition of only one more zone, the tropical zone.

The San Francisco Peaks themselves contain four of the six life zones. The four life zones that are found along the slopes of the San Francisco Peaks are listed below along with their approximate elevation ranges, dominant tree species found within each of the four life zones, and average annual precipitation of each life zone:
The dominant tree species is the southwestern ponderosa pine (Pinus brachyptera Engel.). Gambel oak (Quercus gambelii) is a common associate of the ponderosa pine at lower elevations in the forest along with New Mexico locust (Robina neomexicana). At higher elevations, associates include southwestern white pine (Pinus strobiformis), Rocky Mountain Douglas-fir, (Pseudotsuga menziesii var. glauca), Rocky Mountain white fir (Abies concolor var. concolor), and quaking aspen (Populus tremuloides).
Species such as Douglas-fir (Pseudotsuga menziesii var. glauca), white fir (Abies concolor), limber pine (Pinus flexilis var. reflexa), blue spruce. (Picea pungens), and less commonly Southwestern white pine (Pinus flexilis) form mixed stands in this community, with Ponderosa pine (Pinus brachyptera Engel.) joining the mix on warmer slopes.
 Subalpine conifer forest – The elevation of this zone varies from approximately  feet. The dominant tree species of this zone are Engelmann spruce (Picea engelmannii subsp. engelmannii), corkbark fir (Abies lasiocarpa var. arizonica), quaking aspen (Populus tremuloides) and the Rocky Mountain bristlecone pine. (Pinus aristata).
Only a few small herbaceous plants have established themselves in the tundra. One of these species, is the endemic and threatened San Francisco Peaks groundsel (Packera franciscana), which is found nowhere else in the world.

In native culture
The San Francisco Peaks have considerable religious significance to thirteen local American Indian tribes (including the Havasupai, Navajo, Hopi, and Zuni.) In particular, the peaks form the Navajo sacred mountain of the west, called . The peaks are associated with the color yellow, and they are said to contain abalone inside, to be secured to the ground with a sunbeam, and to be covered with yellow clouds and evening twilight. They are gendered female.

For the Hopi people, the San Francisco Peaks are associated with the intercardinal direction southwest. They constitute ritually pure sacred spaces, and are used as sources for ceremonial objects. The alignment of the sunset from the peaks to Hopi villages on Black Mesa is used to calculate the winter solstice, signifying “the beginning of a new year, with a new planting season and new life”. The peaks are seen as the home of the katsinam or kachina spirits, ancestors who have become clouds following their death. Katsinam are invited to Hopi villages to serve as ethical and spiritual guides to the Hopi community from midwinter to midsummer. Aaloosaktukwi or Humphrey's Peak holds particular religious significance and is associated with the deity Aaloosaka, a symbol of the Two-Horn Society, a religious group among the Hopi dating to the occupation of the Awat’ovi village on Antelope Mesa. Depiction of the peaks in association with calendar-keeping is attested in a kiva at the Hisatsinom settlement of Homol'ovi, which was occupied from 1250 to 1425; katsinam imagery dates to the 13th century as well. Other Native American peoples also relate kachina spirits to heavy snowfalls on the peaks.

There are several names for the San Francisco Peaks in local languages:
 –(Navajo) (“Dookʼoʼoosłííd”, which means “the summit that never melts” or “the mountain peak that never thaws”.)
 Nuvaʼtukyaʼovi – (Hopi) (Nuvaʼtukyaʼovi, which means “place-of-snow-on-the-very-top”)
 Dził Tso – Dilzhe’e – (Apache)
 Tsii Bina – Aaʼku – (Acoma)
 Nuvaxatuh – Nuwuvi – (Southern Paiute)
 Hvehasahpatch or Huassapatch – Havasu ʼBaaja – (Havasupai)
 Wikʼhanbaja – Hwalʼbay – (Hualapai)
 Wi꞉mun Kwa – Yavapai
 Sunha Kʼhbchu Yalanne – A:shiwi (Zuni)
 ʼAmat ʼIikwe Nyava – Hamakhav – (Mojave)
 Sierra sin Agua – (Spanish)
 The Peaks – (Anglo Arizonans)

See also
 San Francisco volcanic field
 List of mountains and hills of Arizona by height

References

Further reading

External links

 Shaded relief map of the Peaks, showing locations of the principal peaks
 San Francisco Peaks at Coconino National Forest
Around the Peaks Loop scenic drive at Coconino National Forest
 San Francisco Peak Trails at HikeArizona.COM
 Live webcam of the San Francisco Peaks
 Hart Prairie Preserve at Nature Conservancy

Religious places of the indigenous peoples of North America
Volcanoes of Arizona
Mountain ranges of Arizona
Sacred mountains
Mountain ranges of Coconino County, Arizona
Stratovolcanoes of the United States
Extinct volcanoes
Coconino National Forest
Pleistocene stratovolcanoes